Robert Lee Vaughan (born June 12, 1927) is an American politician. He served as a member of the Mississippi House of Representatives.

Life and career 
Vaughan was born in Kansas City, Missouri. He was a feed mill operator.

In 1965, Vaughan was elected to the Mississippi House of Representatives after R. L. Fox resigned. He served until 1968.

References 

1927 births
Living people
Politicians from Kansas City, Missouri
Members of the Mississippi House of Representatives
20th-century American politicians